IASC may refer to:
 The UK's Independent Anti-Slavery Commissioner
 International Accounting Standards Committee
 International Arctic Science Committee
 International Association for Statistical Computing
 International Association for the Study of the Commons
 International Association of Skateboard Companies
 the Inter-Agency Standing Committee of the United Nations for coordination of humanitarian assistance 
 International Astronomical Search Collaboration